Dejon Slavov is a Bulgarian sprint canoer who competed in the early 1990s. He won three bronze medals at the ICF Canoe Sprint World Championships (C-4 500 m: 1990, C-4 1000 m: 1990, 1991).

References

ICF medalists for Olympic and World Championships - Part 2: rest of flatwater (now sprint) and remaining canoeing disciplines: 1936-2007.

Bulgarian male canoeists
Living people
Year of birth missing (living people)
ICF Canoe Sprint World Championships medalists in Canadian